This is a record of Uruguay's results at the FIFA World Cup.

Uruguay have won four FIFA-organized World Football Championships. They won the first World Championship organized by FIFA under the Olympic Committee umbrella with true representation from all continents; before then, football in the Olympics comprised only European teams. Uruguay then won the next two World Cups (Jules Rimet Trophy) in which they participated; these tournaments, the 1930 and 1950 FIFA World Cups, were fully independent from the Olympics and employed clear rules distinguishing professional and amateur football players. Since 1924 marked the beginning of true international football competition, organized by FIFA, FIFA recognizes Uruguay as four-time world champions and allows the team to wear four stars on their uniforms during official international football competitions. (Before 1974, the FIFA World Cup was referred to as the Football World Championship, and the nine champions from 1930 to 1970 received replicas of the Jules Rimet Trophy.) Uruguay hosted and won the first FIFA World Cup in 1930, beating Argentina 4–2 in the final. They won their second and last title in 1950, upsetting host Brazil 2–1 in the final match. The team have qualified for fourteen World Cups, reaching the second round in ten, the semi-finals five times, and the final twice. They also won the gold medal in Olympic football twice, in 1924 and 1928, before the creation of the World Cup. Uruguay won the 1980 Mundialito, a tournament comprising former World Cup champions hosted in Uruguay to celebrate the 50th anniversary of the first World Championship. Uruguay is one of the most successful teams in the world, having won nineteen FIFA official titles: two World Cups, two Olympic Games, and fifteen Copa América championships.

Uruguay refused to participate in 1934 and defend their title because many European nations declined to take part in 1930 held in Uruguay. They also refused to enter in 1938 because FIFA's decision to hold the tournament in France caused outrage in South America where it was believed that the venue would alternate between the two continents.

World Cup record

*Draws include knockout matches decided via penalty shoot-out.

Record by opponent

Uruguay 1930

Semi-finals

Final

Brazil 1950

Final round

Switzerland 1954

Quarter-final

Semi-final

Bronze Final

Chile 1962

England 1966

Quarter-final

Mexico 1970

Quarter-final

Semi-final

Bronze Final

West Germany 1974

Mexico 1986

Round of 16

Italy 1990

Group E

Round of 16

South Korea/Japan 2002

Group A

South Africa 2010

Group A

Round of 16

Quarter-final

Semi-final

Bronze Final

Brazil 2014

Group D

Round of 16

Russia 2018

Group A

Round of 16

Quarter-final

Qatar 2022

Group stage

Most appearances

Top goalscorers

References

External links
The Official website of the Asociación Uruguaya de Fútbol
 FIFA Official Ranking of all Participants at Finals 1930–2002. FIFA Match Results for all Stages 1930–2002
 FIFA official site

 
World Cup
Countries at the FIFA World Cup